Roebuck railway station served the village of Bilsborrow, Lancashire, England, from 1840 to 1849 on the Lancaster and Preston Junction Railway.

History 
The station opened on 26 June 1840 by the Lancaster and Preston Junction Railway. It was named after what is now the Roebuck Hotel.

References

External links 

Disused railway stations in the Borough of Wyre
Railway stations in Great Britain opened in 1840
Railway stations in Great Britain closed in 1849
1840 establishments in England
1849 disestablishments in England